The Egypt men's national under-19 volleyball team, represents Egypt in international volleyball competitions and friendly matches. The team is four-time African Champion.

Results
 Champions   Runners up   Third place   Fourth place

Green border color indicates tournament was held on home soil.

Summer Youth Olympics

FIVB U19 World Championship

African Championship U19

Team

Current squad

The following is the Egyptian roster in the 2015 FIVB Volleyball Boys' U19 World Championship.

Head Coach: Emadeldin Nawar

References

External links
www.fevb.org 

Volleyball
National men's under-19 volleyball teams
Volleyball in Egypt
Men's sport in Egypt